Dadong is a station on the Orange line of Kaohsiung MRT in Fongshan District, Kaohsiung, Taiwan.

Station overview
The station is a four-level, underground station with two stacked side platforms and two exits. The station is 151 metres long and is located at the intersection of Guangyuan Rd. and Dadong 1st Rd.

Station layout

Exits
Exit 1: Dadong Park
Exit 2: Dadong Elementary School, Dadong Arts Center

Around the station
 Dadong Arts Center
 Fengshan Tiangong Temple
 Fengshan Longshan Temple
 Kaohsiung City Symphony Orchestra
 Republic of China Military Academy
 Dadong Elementary School
 Dadong Wetlands Park
 Fengshan County New Town East Wicket Gate (鳳山縣新城東便門)
 Beimen Park (Fengshan)
 Nanmen Park (Fengshan)
 Fengshan Bus Station (鳳山轉運站)
 Fengshan District Office

References

2008 establishments in Taiwan
Kaohsiung Metro Orange line stations
Railway stations opened in 2008